Homophthalic acid is a dicarboxylic acid with the formula C6H4(CO2H)CH2CO2H.  It is a colorless solid.  The compounds can be prepared by the Willgerodt reaction from 2-acetylbenzoic acid.

One of the uses is in the preparation of the NSAID tesicam.

References

Benzoic acids
Dicarboxylic acids
Acetic acids